UT Football may refer to:
 Tennessee Volunteers football
 Texas Longhorns football
 Utah Utes football
 University of Tulsa Golden Hurricane football